Seny (from Proto-Germanic *sinnaz) is a form of ancestral Catalan wisdom or sensibleness. It involves well-pondered perception of situations, level-headedness, awareness, integrity, and right action.  More specifically, a National Geographic anthropologist defined seny as "a kind of refined good sense and self-realization."

The opposite of seny is known as rauxa "sudden determination or action".

Cultural significance
Many Catalans consider seny something unique to their culture, a true Catalan symbol. Seny as a particular characteristic of Catalan society is based on a set of ancestral local customs stemming from the scale of values and social norms of traditional Catalan rural society. The values of seny were transmitted from generation to generation without much change by the exemplary behaviour of the elder members of the family, as well as in the shape of aphorisms and moral stories. The latter were largely based on Christian values and their examples and illustrations often included animals and plants that were common in rural Catalonia.

This oral lore caught the attention of Josep Torras i Bages, bishop of Vic at the beginning of the 20th century.
He became very interested in the pattern in which the seny was transmitted from one generation to the other as an oral tradition. Thus he encouraged Josep Abril i Virgili (1869–1918), a writer, to gather the moral stories and illustrate them in a book that was published as Bon seny ("Good sense"). This more or less representative compilation of moral lessons regarding seny was illustrated by artist Joan Junceda (1881–1948). Published in the Catalan language before the Spanish Civil War, Bon seny became rare under General Francisco Franco, when so much Catalan printed material had been burned and printing in Catalan was severely restricted.

Many of the seny proverbs that defined traditional Catalan values have lost most of their meaning. The reason is the erosion of Christian values as fundamental in today's post-Christian Catalan society, which now sees itself as based largely on secular principles.

Seny is mentioned in the motto of castells, the Catalan tradition of building human towers, as one of the values of that endeavour: Força, equilibri, valor i seny (strength, balance, courage, and seny).

Examples
Many of the seny aphorisms are short:

The following story, La rata magra or La rata engarjolada, illustrates the dangers of greed:

See also
Josep Torras i Bages
Reasonable person and moron in a hurry, legal concepts
Sisu, a Finnish word meaning inner strength

Bibliography
 Ausiàs March, Plena de Seny.
 Cerverí de Girona, Obra moral; Oració de tot dia; Mal dit ben dit; Testament; La faula del rossinyol; sermó; proverbis.
 Jaume Raventós, Proses de bon seny, morals i socials. "Foment de pietat catalana". Barcelona 1923 (4 volums)
 Josep Maria Folch i Torres, Historietes exemplars, Barcelona 1938 (10 volums). Reed. Editorial Balmes, 1984.
 Gaziel, Seny, treball i llibertat. 1963

References

External links
 Carta del Bisbe de Vic a Jaume Raventós en aplegar els volums titulats Proses de bon Seny
Pàgines viscudes (1915-1938). Josep Maria Folch i Torres

Catalan symbols
Concepts in ethics
Virtue
Oral tradition
Catalan words and phrases